The University of Jambi (UNJA, or Universitas Jambi) is a public university located in Jambi City, Jambi, Indonesia. The university was registered by Minister of PTIP decree Number 25 of 1963, as The State University of Jambi.

History

Founding and early history
Before the foundation of the university, in 1960 there was Akademi Perniagaan Djambi (the Academy of Commerce in Jambi) under Jajasan Perguruan Tinggi Djambi (the Foundation of Tertiary Education in Jambi) which was chaired by R. Sudarsono who was the mayor of the city. In 1961, the academy transformed itself as the Faculty of Economics along with the establishment of the Faculty of Law, both affiliated to University of Indonesia Faculty of Economics. With those faculties, local public figures and Jambi provincial government were seeking to establish a university in their own region through Panitia Persiapan Pendirian Universitas Negeri Jambi (The Establishment of Jambi State University Preparatory Committee). The committee was headed by Col. M.J. Singedekane who was the governor of Jambi.

The State University of Jambi was the result of the committee established on 1 April 1963. The committee then opened two more faculties, The Faculty of Agriculture and The Faculty of Animal Agriculture and as of 1 April 1963, The State University of Jambi had faculties of Economics, Law, Agriculture and Animal Agriculture. From that day on, 1 April is commemorated as the day of birth of the university.

In 1966, Indonesian President issued a decree declaring the establishment of the university as Jambi University. The letter carrying the decree did not arrive in Jambi until the issuing of Presidential Decree Number 41 of 1982. The Minister of PTIP decree, beside acknowledging the foundation of the university, recognized Col. M.J. Singedekane, also acting as the head of the committee, as the president in charge leading the university. The term ‘President of the University’ started from 1963 till 1977. It ended when Drs. Kemas Mohamad Saleh was appointed as Acting Rector by Indonesian Minister of Education and Culture.

Presidents of the university before the name alteration were:
 Djamaluddin Tambunan, S.H. 1974-1977 
 R.M. Nur Atmadibrata, 1968-1974
 H. A. Manap, 1966-1968
 Colonel M.J. Singedekane, 1963-1966

On 12 September 1980, Drs. Kemas Mohamad Saleh who became the Acting Rector was appointed as Rector of the university ending the transition period of leadership of the university. Since January 1985, Ir. S.B. Samad was the second Rector while completing his period in 1994. As of 1994, the rectors of the university are:

 Prof. Johni Najwan, S.H., M.H., PhD (2016–present)
 Prof. Aulia Tasman, PhD (2012–2016)
 H. Kemas Arsyad Somad, S.H., M.H. (2003 – 2012)
 Prof.DR.Ir. Ali M.A. Rachman, M.A (1999-2003)
 Prof.DR.Ir.H.Soedarmadi Hardjosuwignyo, MSc (1994-1999)
 Ir. S.B. Samad (1985-1994)
 Drs. Kemas Mohamad Saleh (1977-1984)

Expansion
In 2001, it opened the graduate program of Management and the graduate program of Economic Development. In 2002, other programs at diploma level, Forage Production and Technology Studies and Study of Animal Agribusiness at the faculty of animal agriculture, were introduced. The Law extension program was announced and a year later, in 2003, an undergraduate degree of Socio-economic study of animal agriculture was offered.

In 2004, the university opened its extension program of Accounting at the Faculty of Economics. In the same year, Jambi University made a partnership with Jakarta State University opening postgraduate programs of Education Management and of Environmental Education.

In 2005, the university re-opened its undergraduate program of physicians' education and of Physical Education and Health. In the same year, the graduate program was admitted.

Since its establishment in 1963 up to 2006, the Jambi University has 22 undergraduate, 10 diploma, 4 graduate and 4 undergraduate extension programs.

Campus
Jambi University owns several campuses. The main campus where most of the colleges are located is in Kampus Pinang Masak, Mendalo Darat, Jalan Raya Jambi - Ma. Bulian KM 5.

Organization

University
The current rector is Prof. Drs. H. Sutrisno, MSc, PhD

Schools and colleges
UNJA has seventeen schools and colleges, each with a dean and organization.

College of Teacher Training and Education
The college currently houses four departments comprising a number of study programs. The college currently offers various programs at bachelor, master, and doctoral level.

Faculty of Teacher Training and Education is led by a Dean and four Vice Deans:
 Dean: Prof. Dr. M. Rusdi, S.Pd, MSc
 Vice Dean I (Academic Affair): Drs. Aripuddin, M.Hum
 Vice Dean II (Administrative Affair): Drs. Akhyarudin, M.Hum
 Vice Dean III (Student Affair): Drs. Abu Bakar, M.Pd

Departments

Language and Arts Education Department
Language and Arts Education Department or Jurusan Pendidikan Bahasa dan Seni (PBS) aims at educating and training prospective teachers of languages. The department currently has two study programs, Pendidikan Bahasa dan Sastra Indonesia (Indonesian Language and Literature) and English Education Study Program
 Department Chair : Dra. H. Yusra D., M.Pd
 Secretary : Dra. Armiwati, M.Hum

Indonesian Language and Literature Education Study Program
 Chair, Bachelor's degree Program: Drs. Albertus Sinaga, M.Pd
 Secretary, Bachelor's degree Program:  
 Chair, Master's degree Program:  
 Secretary, Master's degree Program:

English Education Study Program
English Education Study Program is one of the study programs in Language and Arts Education Department. Its aim is to train and educate prospective teachers of English as a Foreign Language, particularly in secondary schools. The study program currently offers bachelor's degree (S1) and master's degree (S2).

 Chair, Bachelor's degree Program: Dedy Kurniawan, S.S, M.A
 Secretary, Bachelor's degree Program: Masbirorotni, S.Pd, MSc.Ed
 Chair, Master's degree Program: Dr. Rachmawati, M.Pd
 Secretary, Master's degree Program: Dr. Hadiyanto, S.Pd, MEd

Educational Study Department

Mathematics and Natural Sciences Education

Social Sciences Education

Notes

External links 
 
Ranking and review

Universities in Indonesia
Educational institutions established in 1963
Indonesian state universities
Jambi (city)
Universities in Jambi
1963 establishments in Indonesia